Banisia  aldabrana is a species of moth of the family Thyrididae. It is found in the Seychelles on the islands of  Aldabra, Menai and Cosmoledo and in South Africa.

The forewings of this species are light fuscous brown, tinged with rufous and uniformly striated with darker brown.
The female is wholly suffused with brick red.

Their wingspan is 15 to 18 mm.

Subspecies
Banisia aldabrana aldabrana (from Seychelles)
Banisia aldabrana cana  Whalley, 1971 (South Africa)

References

Thyrididae
Moths described in 1912
Moths of Africa
Fauna of Seychelles